Smithville is an unincorporated community and census-designated place (CDP) in Peoria County, Illinois, United States. It is in the southern part of the county, in the center of Logan Township.

Smithville was first listed as a CDP prior to the 2020 census.

Demographics

References 

Census-designated places in Peoria County, Illinois
Census-designated places in Illinois